Tavadze is a Georgian surname. Notable people with the surname include:
Dimitri Tavadze (1911–1990), Georgian artist and scenographer
Giorgi Tavadze (born 1955), Georgian former footballer
Saba Tavadze (born 1993), Georgian Football midfielder
Tamar Tavadze (1898–1975), Georgian artist, theatre painter, sculptor and architect
Zaza Tavadze (born 1975), Georgian judge

Surnames of Georgian origin
Georgian-language surnames